Santa Rosa station is a railway station located on the South Main Line in Santa Rosa, Laguna, Philippines.

The station was opened on October 10, 1908. Also known then as Santa Rosa Biñang, it is the first railroad station serving the then-town of Santa Rosa.

References

Philippine National Railways stations
Railway stations in Laguna (province)
Buildings and structures in Santa Rosa, Laguna